Damon Williams (born December 13, 1973) is an American former professional basketball player from Seattle. He achieved notable success playing for Tampereen Pyrintö in the Finnish Korisliiga. During his professional playing career he also played multiple seasons in Italy.

Pyrintö retired Williams′ jersey #32 in December 2018.

Honors
 Jersey #32 retired by Pyrintö
3x Korisliiga (2010–2011, 2014)
Finnish Cup (2013)
2x Finnish League MVP (2001, 2011)
3x Finnish Finals MVP (2010–2011, 2014)

References

External links
 Profile at Eurobasket.com
 Profile at Finnish Basketball Association 

1973 births
Living people
Alba Fehérvár players
American expatriate basketball people in Finland
American expatriate basketball people in Hungary
American expatriate basketball people in Italy
American men's basketball players
Basketball players from Seattle
CSU Pueblo ThunderWolves men's basketball players
Kobrat players
KTP-Basket players
Pallalcesto Amatori Udine players
Pallacanestro Biella players
Power forwards (basketball)
S.S. Felice Scandone players
Tampereen Pyrintö players